Smiles S.A. is a Brazilian company which manages Smiles loyalty program, the former frequent-flyer program of Varig, a Brazilian carrier, now switched to GOL Linhas Aéreas Inteligentes S.A.

History 

Varig launched its frequent-flyer program in 1994, as the biggest airline in Brazil and in 1997 started to use a co-branding strategy with credit card issuers.
As Varig's economical conditions became desperate in the early 2000s, the company has been split in two, the "new" Varig with most of the airplanes, routes, and the mileage program, and the "old" one, mainly with the debts.  The resulting new company was initially sold to VarigLog, its former air cargo subsidiary.
As GOL took over Varig's operations, they decided to absorb the Smiles program, aiming its later conversion for an independent business unit.
After the successful IPO of Multiplus, the loyalty program from GOL's competitor, TAM Linhas Aéreas (now part of LATAM Airlines Group), GOL decided to split that business from the airline and go public, which has been carried in April 2013.

Benefit sharing 

On July 6, 2010, Delta Air Lines announced an agreement to redeem Smiles mileage for SkyMiles benefits and vice versa. Such announcement was tied to a codeshare agreement between the airlines.
Smiles's mileage can also be redeemed for Air France–KLM, Korean Air, Aeromexico, Tap Portugal, Aerolineas Argentinas, Copa Airlines, Etihad Airways, Alitalia, Air Canada and Qatar Airways flights. However, as of early 2020, Delta and GOL have ended their partnership and the subsequent sharing of benefits between the two airlines.

References

External links 
 Gol Linhas Aéreas Inteligentes S.A. website

Companies listed on B3 (stock exchange)
Gol Transportes Aéreos